Cavalo de Aço is a Brazilian telenovela produced and broadcast by TV Globo. It premiered on 24 January 1973 and ended on 21 August 1973, with a total of 179 episodes in Black and white. It is the twelfth "novela das oito" to be aired on the timeslot. It was created and written by Walter Negrão and directed by Walter Avancini, David Grimberg and Daniel Filho.

Cast 
 Tarcísio Meira - Rodrigo Soares
 Glória Menezes - Miranda
 Ziembinski - Max
 Betty Faria - Joana
 Edson França - Lucas
 Cláudio Cavalcanti - Aurélio
 Milton Moraes - Carlão
 Arlete Salles - Lenita
 Carlos Vereza - Santo
 Renata Sorrah - Camila
 José Wilker - Atílio
 Stênio Garcia - Brucutu
 José Lewgoy - Professor
 Dary Reis - Sabá
 Suzana Gonçalves - Bisteca
 Elizângela - Teresinha
 Mário Lago - Inácio
 Maria Luiza Castelli - Marta
 Paulo Gonçalves - Tobias
 Miriam Pires - Benvinda
 Sônia Oiticica - Catarina
 Nilton Villar - Jorge
 Paulo Padilha - Almeida
 Tony Ferreira - Dr. Castro
 Germano Filho - Arsênio
 Francisco Milani - Moraes
 Walter Mattesco - Dr. Renato
 Talita Miranda - Maria Amélia
 Marilene Silva - Alzira
 Sérgio Mansur - Ciro
 Reinaldo Gonzaga - Felipe
 Urbano Lóes - Campelo
 Nair Prestes - Juventina
 Darcy de Souza - Socorro
 Francisco Silva - Tonho
 Rosana Garcia - Ninita
 Ricardo Garcia - Zezinho
 Fúlvio Stefanini - Euclides
 Castro Gonzaga - Cecil
 Fábio Sabag - Patrocínio Cardoso

References 

TV Globo telenovelas
1973 telenovelas
Brazilian telenovelas
1973 Brazilian television series debuts
1973 Brazilian television series endings
Portuguese-language telenovelas